Chase University (often known as Andre Chase University and  Chase U) is an American professional wrestling stable consisting of Andre Chase, Duke Hudson and Thea Hail. They are currently signed to WWE, where they perform on NXT. The group's characters contain elements of a post-secondary educational university.

History

NXT (2021-present)
On the September 21 episode of NXT, Chase debuted a new heel teacher persona and began hosting a segment on the show called Andre Chase University. Over the next few months, Chase recruited Bodhi Hayward and Thea Hail as his new students for Chase University and slowly turned face. On the September 20, 2022 episode of NXT, Chase and Hayward picked up a victory over Carmelo Hayes and Trick Williams.

In November, WWE released Hayward, thereby removing him from Chase University. On the November 1 episode of NXT, Duke Hudson replaced Hayward as Chase U's flag bearer and slowly turned face.

On the January 31, 2023 episode of NXT, Chase U defeated The Dyad (Rip Fowler and Jagger Reid) and Malik Blade and Edris Enofé in a triple threat tag team match to become the fourth team to challenge for the NXT Tag Team Championship at NXT Vengeance Day. At the event, they were unsuccessful at capturing the titles.

Members

Current

Former

Sub-groups

Current

Former

See also
The Spirit Squad

References

WWE teams and stables